Banskandi is a Block level area in Cachar district, Assam, India, almost 13 km from Silchar.

Geography
Banskandi is located at an elevation of 23 m MSL.

Location 
National Highway 53, now, National Highway 37 passes through Banskandi.

Languages and Peoples 

Bengali and Manipuri are the major population of the area, Bengali language is the common languages spoken in the region as a commercial language. Hindi Speaking people are very few in numbers.

School and Institute 

 Banskandi Darul Ullum Madrassa
 Banskandi Nena Meah Higher Secondary School
 MD English School
Pioneer English school
 Banskandi Junior College
 Barak Valley Secondary School
N.I.M public school
Moulana Ahmed Ali Degree college

References

External links
Satellite map of Banskandi
Wikimapia

Silchar
Villages in Cachar district